
Peter Bondanella (1943–2017) was Distinguished Professor Emeritus of Italian, Comparative Literature, and Film Studies at Indiana University, United States.

Selected publications
Federico Fellini: Essays in Criticism. Ed. by P. Bondanella.  Oxford: Oxford University Press, 1978. 315 pp. .
The Eternal City: Roman Images in the Modern World. Chapel Hill: University of North Carolina Press, 1987. 286 pp.
Vasari, G. The Lives of the Artists. Translated with an introduction and notes by J.C. and P. Bondanella. Oxford: Oxford World's Classics, 1991. .
The Cinema of Federico Fellini. Princeton: Princeton University Press, 1992. "Foreword" by Federico Fellini. 396 pp. Translations into Italian and Chinese.
Umberto Eco and the Open Text: Semiotics, Fiction, Popular Culture. Cambridge: Cambridge University Press, 1997.
The Films of Federico Fellini. Cambridge: Cambridge University Press, 2002. 205 pp. .
Hollywood's Italians: Dagos, Palookas, Romeos, Wise Guys, and Sopranos. New York: Continuum International, 2004. 352 pages and 55 still photographs.
A History of the Italian Cinema. New York: Continuum, 2009.
New Essays on Umberto Eco. Cambridge: Cambridge University Press, 2009.

Awards
Election to European Academy for the Sciences and the Arts (2009).
Distinguished Service Award, University of South Florida.
Pulitzer Prize Nomination for The Eternal City: Roman Images in the Modern World (1987).

References

1943 births
2017 deaths
Indiana University faculty
Indiana University Bloomington faculty
University of Oregon alumni
Stanford University alumni